Dub Housing is the second album by American rock band Pere Ubu. Released in 1978 by Chrysalis Records, the album is now regarded as one of their best, described by Trouser Press as "simply one of the most important post-punk recordings."

The title is an allusion to the visual echoes of blocks of identical row houses in Baltimore, presumably reminiscent of the echo and reverberation that characterize dub. "Dub" is also a reference to Jehovah's Witnesses, who refer to themselves as "Dubs". Lead singer David Thomas was a Jehovah's Witness. On a 1979 concert bootleg recording, during the song "Sentimental Journey," David Thomas ad-libs the line "I live in a dub house!" The photograph on the cover shows the apartment building at 3206 Prospect Avenue near downtown Cleveland in which members of the band lived when this album was recorded.

Reception and legacy

At the end of 1978, NME named Dub Housing the year's eighth best album, while Sounds ranked it at number 13 on its year-end list. Robert Christgau of The Village Voice wrote in 1979, "not only is it abrasive and visionary and eccentric and hard-rocking itself, but it sent me back to The Modern Dance, which I liked fine originally and like more now". In The Village Voices Pazz & Jop critics' poll for 1979, Dub Housing placed at number nine.

The album has been reissued several times: in 1989 on CD by Rough Trade Records, in 1999 on CD by Thirsty Ear Records, in 2008 on CD on Cooking Vinyl, and in 2015 on CD and vinyl by Fire Records.

Track listing
All songs written by David Thomas, Tom Herman, Tony Maimone, Allen Ravenstine and Scott Krauss.
"Navvy" – 2:40
"On the Surface" – 2:35
"Dub Housing" – 3:39
"Caligari's Mirror" – 3:49
"Thriller!" – 4:36
"I, Will Wait" – 1:45
"Drinking Wine Spodyody" – 2:44
"(Pa) Ubu Dance Party" – 4:46
"Blow Daddy-O" – 3:38
"Codex" – 4:55

Personnel
Pere Ubu
David Thomas – vocals, organ
Tom Herman – guitar, bass, organ
Tony Maimone – bass, guitar, piano
Allen Ravenstine – EML synthesizers, saxophone
Scott Krauss – drums

Technical
Pere Ubu – production
Ken Hamann – production, recording, engineering, EQ and mastering
David Thomas – EQ and mastering

References

External links

Pere Ubu albums
1978 albums
Chrysalis Records albums
Rough Trade Records albums
Cooking Vinyl albums
Fire Records (UK) albums